The 1972 Italian general election was held in Italy on 7 May 1972. The Christian Democracy (DC) remained stable with around 38% of the votes, as did the Communist Party (PCI) which obtained the same 27% it had in 1968. The Socialist Party (PSI) continued in its decline, reducing to less than 10%. The largest increase in vote share was that of the post-fascist Italian Social Movement, which nearly doubled its votes from 4.5% to about 9%, after its leader Giorgio Almirante launched the formula of the National Right, proposing his party as the sole group of the Italian right wing. After a disappointing result of less than 2%, against the 4.5% of 1968, the Italian Socialist Party of Proletarian Unity was disbanded; a majority of its members joined the PCI.

Electoral system
The electoral system for the Chamber of Deputies was pure party-list proportional representation. Italian provinces were grouped into 32 constituencies, each electing a group of candidates. At constituency level, seats were divided between open lists using the largest remainder method with Imperiali quota. Remaining votes and seats were transferred at national level, where they were divided using the Hare quota, and automatically distributed to best losers into the local lists.

For the Senate, 237 single-seat constituencies were established, even if the assembly had risen to 315 members. The candidates needed a landslide victory of two-thirds of votes to be automatically elected, a goal which could be reached only by the German minorities in South Tirol. All remaining votes and seats were grouped in party lists and regional constituencies, where a D'Hondt method was used: inside the lists, candidates with the best percentages were elected.

Historical background
The period of the late 1960s–1970s came to be known as the Opposti Estremismi, (from left-wing and right-wing extremists riots), later renamed anni di piombo ("years of lead") because of a wave of bombings and shootings — the first victim of this period was Antonio Annarumma, a policeman, killed on 12 November 1969 in Milan during a left-wing demonstration.

In December, four bombings struck the Monument of Vittorio Emanuele II in Rome (Altare della Patria), the Banca Nazionale del Lavoro, and in Milan the Banca Commerciale and the Banca Nazionale dell'Agricoltura. The latter bombing, known as the Piazza Fontana bombing of 12 December 1969, killed 17 and injured 88.

Communist Secretary Luigi Longo suffered a stroke in late 1968; although partially recovering in the following months, from February 1969 he was assisted in most decisions by Enrico Berlinguer acting as cive-secretary. Longo resigned the position of party secretary in 1972, supporting the choice of Berlinguer as his successor.

Berlinguer's unexpected stance made waves: he gave the strongest speech by a major Communist leader ever heard in Moscow. He refused to "excommunicate" the Chinese communists, and directly told Leonid Brezhnev that the invasion of Czechoslovakia by the Warsaw Pact countries (which he termed the "tragedy in Prague") had made clear the considerable differences within the Communist movement on fundamental questions such as national sovereignty, socialist democracy, and the freedom of culture.

Arturo Michelini, leader of the Italian Social Movement, died in 1969, and the party's first and charismatic leader Giorgio Almirante regained control. He attempted to revitalise the party by pursuing an aggressive policy against left-wing student uprisings; the 1968 student movement had been devastating for the party's youth organisation. Following Michelini's failed approach of inserimento, Almirante introduced a double strategy of hard anti-systemic discourse combined with the creation of a broader "National Right" (Destra Nazionale) coalition.

Parties and leaders

Results
Mathematically, the election seemed to give the same results of four years before, the three major parties receiving quite the same preferences. However, the success of the operation of the National Right by MSI, gave a golden share to the PSI, because the Christian Democrats had no more possibilities to look at their right to build a democratic government, the alliance with the Socialists becoming quite obliged. Incumbent Prime Minister Giulio Andreotti tried to continue his centrist strategy, but his attempt only lasted a year. Former Premier Mariano Rumor so returned at the head of the government with his traditional centre-left alliance between DC, PSI, PSDI and PRI, but he was abandoned by the Republicans after eight months. He continued with a new squad, but he couldn't withstand the shocks deriving by the divorce referendum of 1974. After the consequent great controversies between Catholics and secularists, former Premier Aldo Moro persuaded the Socialists to accept a minority government composed only of the Christian Democrats and the Republicans. However, new problem arose from the regional elections of 1975, which marked a great success of the left, which consequently called for new national elections. When the Republicans too left Moro in 1976, no possibilities of a new government remained, and an early general election was found necessary.

Chamber of Deputies

Results by constituency

Senate of the Republic

Results by constituency

Maps

References

1972
General election
May 1972 events in Europe